The Mitsubishi Electric Classic is a golf tournament on the PGA Tour Champions in Georgia in the greater Atlanta area. It debuted  in 2013 as the "Greater Gwinnett Championship," and has been played each year at TPC Sugarloaf in Duluth, a northeast  A familiar course, TPC Sugarloaf was a venue on the PGA Tour for twelve seasons (1997–2008) for the AT&T Classic (previously BellSouth Classic).

The purse in 2019 was $1.8 million, with a winner's share of $270,000.

The tournament in 2020 was cancelled due to the COVID-19 pandemic.

Winners

Notes

References

External links

Coverage on the PGA Tour Champions official site

PGA Tour Champions events
Golf in Georgia (U.S. state)
Sports in Duluth, Georgia
Events in Duluth, Georgia
Recurring sporting events established in 2013
2013 establishments in Georgia (U.S. state)